Bożena Zientarska (born 14 November 1952) is a Polish sprinter. She competed in the women's 400 metres at the 1972 Summer Olympics.

References

External links
 

1952 births
Living people
Athletes (track and field) at the 1972 Summer Olympics
Polish female sprinters
Olympic athletes of Poland
Olympic female sprinters